The Association of Community College Trustees (ACCT) is a non-profit educational organization representing more than 6,500 elected and appointed trustees who govern more than 1,200 community colleges in the United States.

ACCT provides members with advocacy efforts aimed at federal government as well as educational services, including annual conventions and seminars, instructional publications, and other board leadership services to community college governing boards.

In 2021, First Lady Jill Biden spoke at the ACCT annual convention about her experience with community colleges and the need to increase federal funding for them.

ACCT was founded in 1969 and is headquartered in Washington, D.C.

References

External links  
Association of Community College Trustees website

Associations of schools
University governance